Kai Behrend is a German mathematician.  He is a professor at the University of British Columbia in Vancouver, British Columbia, Canada.

His work is in algebraic geometry and he has made important contributions in the theory of algebraic stacks, Gromov–Witten invariants and Donaldson–Thomas theory (cf. Behrend function.) He is also known for Behrend's formula, the generalization of the Grothendieck–Lefschetz trace formula to algebraic stacks.

He is the recipient of the 2001 Coxeter–James Prize, the 2011 Jeffery–Williams Prize, and the 2015 CRM-Fields-PIMS Prize. He was elected to the 2018 class of fellows of the American Mathematical Society.

Selected publications

References

External links
The personal web page of Kai Behrend

Algebraic geometers
Geometers
University of California, Berkeley alumni
20th-century German mathematicians
21st-century German mathematicians
Living people
Academic staff of the University of British Columbia Faculty of Science
Year of birth missing (living people)
Scientists from Hamburg
Fellows of the American Mathematical Society